Volume! The French Journal of Popular Music Studies (subtitled in French: La revue des musiques populaires) is a biannual (May and November) peer-reviewed academic journal "dedicated to the study of contemporary popular music". It is published by the Éditions Mélanie Seteun, a publishing association specialized since 1998 in the cultural sociology of popular music.

History 
Volume! was established in 2002 under the title Copyright Volume! by Gérôme Guibert, Marie-Pierre Bonniol, and Samuel Étienne, and obtained its current name in 2009. Étienne (Université de la Polynésie Française) was its first editor-in-chief (2002–2008), before Stéphane Dorin (2009), Gérôme Guibert (2010-2017) and Emmanuel Parent (2017-2022) took over.

Special issues 

The journal publishes special issues on various topics in popular music studies, new musicology, ethnomusicology,<ref>: "There are various other international journals that mix PMS and ethnomusicological approaches, often based within, and reaching out from, a particular region. These include journals such as Latin American Music Review, South African Music Studies, Brazilian Journal of Song Studies, and Volume! The French Journal of Popular Music Studies."</ref> sociology, geography, cultural history, cultural studies, aesthetics, etc.

Recent topics include music videos (2018, n° 14-2), Jamaican Music (2017, n° 13-2), French punk scenes (2016, N° 13-1), The Beatles (2016, n° 12-2), French chanson and immigration (2015, n°12-1),The selected proceedings of the conference held at the Bibliothèque Nationale de France. "nostalgia" (2015, n°11-1), music and dance (2014, n°10-2), "listening" (2013, n°10-1), Black music (2011, n°8-1) gender and race issues in hip hop (2011, n°8-2), "metal studies", "countercultures" (2012, n°9-1 & 9-2), and cover versions (2010, n°7-1 & 7-2),Volume! publishes a "varia" section for articles not related to the main topic, plus editorials, letters, and book reviews.

 Distribution 

 Online access 
Since November 2011, Volume ! is included in the French academic journals portal  and since December 2011 in the Belgian portal, Cairn.info. All issues are available online on Openedition.org (formerly Revues.org); the six latest ones are on Cairn.info with the last four under restricted access. Since June 2016, it is also on RILM Abstracts with Full Text (RAFT).

 Abstracting and indexing 
The journal  is abstracted and indexed in the International Index to Music Periodicals, the Répertoire International de Littérature Musicale, the Music Index and Music & Performing Arts Online. The articles dealing with jazz are indexed on the Jazz Institut Darmstadt bibliography and the ones dealing with heavy metal/hard rock on the University of Central Missouri/ISMMS's metal studies bibliography. Volume ! is registered by the AERES in the 18th section ("Arts").

 Sponsors 
The journal is classified by the AERES (18th section of the CNU, May 2012). It is published with the support of the French National Book Center (Centre national du livre) and the French National Centre for Scientific Research.

 Events and partnerships 

 Vibrations. Musiques, médias, société 
Volume and the Éditions Mélanie Seteun have directed the electronic publication of the first French popular music studies journal Vibrations. Musiques, médias, société, created by Antoine Hennion, Jean-Rémy Julien and Jean-Claude Klein in the mid-1980s, on the French academic portal Persée.

 IASPM 
The journal is a frequent partner of the French-speaking branch of the International Association for the Study of Popular Music (IASPM): it publishes the winner of the association's "young researcher" annual award.

 Ashgate 
It also published a special international, English edition of its "countercultures" issues with Ashgate Publishing, a partnership with the Éditions Mélanie Seteun that had already taken place for the publication of the book Stereo: Comparative Perspectives on the Sociological Study of Popular Music in France and Britain.

 Conferences 
It has co-organized many conferences, among which: 
 "Rock and violences in Europe (1955-1990)", in 2017;
 "Conçues pour durer. Perspectives francophones sur les musiques hip-hop";
"Heavy metal et sciences sociales : un état des lieux de la recherche francophone" in Angers (December 2014),;Cf. the program here.
 the 2013 "Changing the Tune. Popular music and politics in the XXIst century" international conference in Strasbourg with the German association ASPM and the French branch of the IASPM.;
 In November 2012, it participated in the conference on "Digital Publishing in the Humanities. Perspectives from France and Canada" organized by the French Consulate in Toronto, the French Institute, the University of Toronto, and York University.;
 "What is it we call “Black music”?" in Bordeaux, 2010.

 Events 

The "Great Black Music" exhibit at the Cité de la Musique in Paris was co-curated by journalist Marc Benaïche and ethnomusicologist Emmanuel Parent.The following articles and interviews: in Telerama here, Libération here, L'Humanité here, Le Point here, Europe 1 here, TSF Jazz here. The latter, a member of the journal's team since 2004, had co-organized the 2010 "What is it we call Black Music?" (Peut-on parler de musique noire ?) conference in Bordeaux whose proceedings were published in Volume! (n°8-1, 2011). He was also in charge of editing the exhibit's catalogue.

 Media 
From October 2012 to January 2013, Volume! editors were offered sequences on François Saltiel's show on Le Mouv'., and the Radio Télévision Suisse dedicated two issues of "Histoire Vivante" to Volume!'' in October 2013. A partnership with the website , created by historian Pierre Rosanvallon, to publish reviews of books dealing with popular music, was started in November 2013.

References

External links 
 Volume's first website

Music journals
Multilingual journals
English-language journals
French-language journals
Popular music
Publications established in 2002
Delayed open access journals
Biannual journals
2002 establishments in France